Margarida Moura (born 30 July 1993 in Porto) is a former Portuguese tennis player.

She won two doubles titles on the ITF Circuit in her career. On 11 June 2012, she reached her best singles ranking of world No. 719. On 15 April 2013, she peaked at No. 504 in the WTA doubles rankings.

Playing for the Portugal Fed Cup team, Moura has a 0–3 win–loss record.

ITF Circuit finals

Doubles: 4 (2 titles, 2 runner-ups)

Fed Cup participation

Singles

Doubles

References
 
 
 

1993 births
Living people
Sportspeople from Porto
Portuguese female tennis players
21st-century Portuguese women